Mavambo/Kusile/Dawn is a Zimbabwean political organisation, founded by Simba Makoni, Kudzai Mbudzi and Ibbo Mandaza.

Zimbabwean Presidential Election of 2008

Simba Makoni was the Mavambo candidate, finishing third with 8.3% of the vote in the first round.

Zimbabwean Senate Election of 2008

There were several notable Mavambo candidates who stood for the Senate of Zimbabwe, including Fay Chung, Margaret Dongo, Ibbo Mandaza, Kudzai Mbudzi, and Edgar Tekere, but none were elected.

After the elections
Since the presidential elections, Makoni has several times indicated his intention to convert his Muvambo/Kusile/Dawn formation into a formal political party. On 22 July 2008, the formation's national management committee met and agreed to finalise the transformation of the project into a political party, to be known as the National Alliance for Democracy Dumiso Dabengwa ended his support for the Mavambo organisation in 2008, leaving to re-establish PF-ZAPU. In 2009, a power struggle developed within the organisation, with Kudzai Mbudzi and other leaders declaring they had removed Makoni.

External links
 http://www.mavambokusiledawn.org/

References

Political parties in Zimbabwe
2008 Zimbabwean general election
2008 establishments in Zimbabwe
Political parties established in 2008